Sadako is a 2019 Japanese supernatural horror film directed by Hideo Nakata. Loosely based on the novel Tide by Koji Suzuki, the film is an installment in the Ring franchise, and a sequel to Nakata's 1999 film Ring 2. The series centers around a vengeful ghost named Sadako Yamamura who is associated with a cursed video tape; whoever watches the tape is killed seven days later.

Sadako premiered in Japan on 24 May 2019, and it played on the opening night of the Fantasia International Film Festival. A tie-in manga series, Sadako-san and Sadako-chan, was published in February before the film's release.

Plot 

Believing her daughter to be Sadako's reincarnation, psychic Hatsuko Sofue prepares to set fire to the padlocked closet where her daughter is confined. Sadako's ghost breaks free from a rock pile concealing a cave on Oshima Island and appears inside Hatsuko's apartment. The little girl suddenly appears outside the closet with Sadako, and Hatsuko collapses in fright as the apartment erupts in flames.

At Kurokawa Memorial General Hospital, clinical psychologist Dr. Mayu Akikawa examines emotionally unstable patient Ms. Kurahashi. Mayu's supervisor Dr. Minoru Fujii cautions Mayu against getting too friendly with unpredictable patients like Kurahashi. Wandering the streets alone, Hatsuko's daughter collapses after encountering the ghost of a woman who jumped off a bridge to her death. Police bring the girl to the hospital.

Detectives inform Fujii and Mayu about the fire that killed five people, including suspected arsonist Hatsuko, at the apartment building. Detectives add that there is no public record for the little girl, whom Hatsuko raised in secret. The girl explains that her mother called her Sadako, although her real name remains unknown. Mayu sees the girl telekinetically toppling toys while being interviewed. Mayu's dropout brother Kazuma works with web marketing consultant Yusuke Ishida to boost his social media presence as an aspiring YouTube personality. Ishida recommends recording a frightening urban experience to excite Kazuma's dwindling audience. Kazuma decides to investigate the apartment building fire.

Meanwhile, another children at the hospital tease the mysterious girl as an outcast due to her unsettling behavior. The girl telekinetically throws a rolling cart at her bullies. The girl collapses after seeing a vision of a dying old man in an elevator. When Mayu consoles her afterward, the girl tells Mayu about being imprisoned in her mother's closet. The girl senses Mayu had a lonely childhood too. The girl collapses after seeing Sadako's ghost reflected on a TV.

Ishida contacts Mayu to report that her brother disappeared following his visit to Hatsuko Sofue's apartment. Mayu watches online video of Kazuma's investigation, which shows talismans covering the interior of the closet where the girl was imprisoned. Kazuma flees in fright when he encounters Sadako's ghost. Mayu pauses on a strange image of skulls underwater. Mayu encounters Ms. Kurahashi in an empty hospital hallway. An altercation ensues when Kurahashi realizes Mayu is afraid of her. Before Kurahashi's anger fully intensifies, the girl entrances her. The girl then collapses. Video of a well suddenly plays on a lobby television. Sadako crawls out of the well, then out of the television, and finally climbs atop Kurahashi. Sadako also grabs Mayu, who faints.

When she recovers, Mayu discovers the girl was taken to ICU in a coma. Kurahashi is readmitted for psychiatric care. Mayu tells Fujii about seeing a ghostly woman with long hair. In a dream, Mayu relives the girl's experience of imprisonment in a closet while her mother accuses her of being Sadako reincarnated. Believing her brother's disappearance is connected, Mayu goes to see Kurahashi demanding to know who Sadako is. Kurahashi recounts the story of Sadako's mother Shizuko Yamamura, a clairvoyant who killed herself following accusations of fraud. Shizuko's daughter Sadako possessed the ability to strike people dead with a thought. Fearful of her power, Sadako's father, Dr. Heihachiro Ikuma, threw the girl down a well to kill her, but created a curse that killed many people.

When Kurahashi grabs her, Mayu sees a vision of Kazuma and Sadako. Kurahashi warns that Mayu's cursed brother cannot be saved. After Mayu leaves, water pools on Kurahashi’s ceiling. Sadako emerges from beneath the bed to kill Kurahashi. While watching another online video of her brother, Mayu sees images of a cave, a baby reflected in an eye, bodies rising from water, a woman falling to her death off a cliff, the submerged skulls seen previously, and also her brother.

Ishida calls to say he watched the strange video too, although he does not know how it was uploaded. Mayu and Ishida meet. Ishida tells Mayu about a cave on Oshima Island in Izu that became a shrine for dead priests until it was rendered off limits by a cave-in. A picture of the shrine shows a talisman like one seen inside the girl's closet. Ishida also mentions an urban legend about a cursed video that once went around the internet. Mayu connects Ishida's notes to Sadako's origin and concludes Sadako was born on Oshima Island.

While taking a ferry to the island, Mayu warns Ishida that circumstances regarding the mysterious little girl's upbringing somehow resurrected Sadako's curse. At the cave, Mayu and Ishida meet an old woman who tells them unwanted babies were left to die inside the shrine and Sadako feeds on their souls. Mayu mentions that she and her brother grew up as orphans and wonders if she and Kazuma were called by Sadako to gather in the cave shrine with other abandoned spirits. Despite warnings about high tide, Mayu and Ishida investigate the cave at night. A ghostly hand pulls Mayu through a rock pile, leaving Ishida outside. Mayu learns Shizuko Yamamura actually abandoned her daughter when she sees a vision of the woman leaving Sadako in the cave as an infant. Sadako survived, which is how she manifested her power.

A vision of the mysterious little girl appears. Writhing bodies rise out of a pool to begin pulling the girl underwater. Mayu embraces the girl, pledges to care for her, and pleads with her to fight back. Back at the hospital at the same time, the little girl comes out of her coma. Mayu sees the skulls and bones underwater as the vision of the girl vanishes. Ishida finally gets into the cave. He and Mayu find Kazuma. As the full moon aligns with a circular opening overhead, Sadako rises to attack Mayu. Kazuma sacrifices himself to rescue his sister. Sadako drowns Kazuma underwater.

Now mentally unstable, Mayu recovers as a patient in her former hospital. Before being discharged, the little girl thanks Mayu for helping her come out of her coma. Left alone afterward, Mayu flinches at the sound of dripping water.

Cast 
 Elaiza Ikeda as Dr. Mayu Akikawa
 Himeka Himejima as Girl / Sadako Yamamura
 Renn Kiriyama as Minoru Fujii
 Hiroya Shimizu as Kazuma Akikawa
 Rie Tomosaka as Hatsuko Sofue
 Takashi Tsukamoto as Yusuke Ishida
 TBA as Ms. Kurahashi
 Ayaka Minami as Sadako Yamamura

Reception
On Rotten Tomatoes, the film has an approval rating of 23% based on 26 reviews, with an average rating of 5/10. The website's critics' consensus reads: "Sadako sees a once-terrifying franchise staggering limply to the finish with a rote final chapter that rehashes previous chapters to diminishing returns".

James Marsh of the South China Morning Post gave the film a score of two-and-a-half out of five stars, writing that the film's "balance between old world and new media is awkward and only intermittently successful, but nevertheless drags this lurching, wayward franchise back in the right direction". Alexandra Heller-Nicholas, writing for the Alliance of Women Film Journalists, commended the film for its exploration of "the deeper, richer psychological terrain which was always in the series", writing positively of its "broad disinterest in continuing rehashing the now thoroughly overcooked cliché of the cursed video as the central narrative core of the film".

Conversely, Meagan Navarro of Bloody Disgusting lamented that the film "presents a wide open world of unexplored possibilities", and concluded that "despite a premise that suggests an attempt to modernize this franchise, nothing has changed at all. What once made Sadako so terrifying [...] has now become far too familiar and ineffective". Polygons Joelle Monique wrote that the film "[loses] several of the key elements that made the original films terrifying and thrilling"; she criticized the ways in which the film deviates from the franchise's established lore, and negatively characterized the film as having "the lowest body count in Ringu franchise history". Nick Allen of RogerEbert.com noted the film as having "sporadic lukewarm scares" and wrote: "Sadako is far too touch-and-go with its chilling potential, all despite the promise from its creepy young lead (Himeka Himejima) [...] there are so many story pieces that don't build to grandiosity, so much as drag viewers to an underwhelming climax".

References

External links
 
 

The Ring (franchise)
2019 horror films
2019 films
2010s Japanese-language films
2010s ghost films
Japanese ghost films
Japanese supernatural horror films
Films about curses
Films about death
Films about social media
2010s Japanese films